Boston Consulting Group, Inc. (BCG) is an American global management consulting firm founded in 1963 and headquartered in Boston, Massachusetts. It is one of the Big Three (or MBB, the world’s three largest management consulting firms by revenue) along with Bain & Company and McKinsey & Company. Since 2021, the consultancy has been led by the German executive Christoph Schweizer.

History
The firm was founded in 1963 as part of The Boston Safe Deposit and Trust Company. Bruce Henderson had been recruited from Arthur D. Little to establish the consulting arm operating as a subsidiary under the name Management and Consulting Division of the Boston Safe Deposit and Trust Company. Initially the division only advised clients of the bank, with billings for the first month at just US$500. Henderson hired his second consultant, Arthur P. Contas, in December 1963. In 1966, BCG opened its second office in Tokyo, Japan.

In 1967, Henderson met Bill Bain and offered him a role at the firm. Bain agreed and joined in 1967 at a starting salary of $17,000 per year. In the early 1970s, Bain was considered internally to be Henderson's eventual successor. However, in 1973 Bain resigned from BCG to start his own strategy consulting firm, Bain & Company, hiring away six of BCG's employees.

In 1974, Henderson arranged an employee stock ownership plan so that the employees could make the company independent from The Boston Safe Deposit and Trust Company. The buyout of all shares was completed in 1979.

In the 1980s, BCG introduced the concept of time-based competition that reconsidered the role of time management in providing market advantages. The concept was the subject of a essay in the Harvard Business Review.

Recruiting
BCG typically hires for an associate or a consultant position, recruiting from top undergraduate colleges, advanced degree programs  and business schools.

BCG growth-share matrix

In the 1970s, BCG created and popularized the "growth–share matrix," a chart to help large corporations decide how to allocate cash among their business units. The corporation would categorize its business units as "Stars," "Cash Cows," "Question Marks," or "Dogs," and then allocate cash accordingly, moving money from Cash Cows toward Stars and Question Marks, which have higher market growth rates and hence greater upside potential.

BCG extended business units

BCG Digital Ventures 
BCG Digital Ventures partners with companies to research, design, and launch new products and services. Ware2Go (a logistics platform developed with United Parcel Service), Tracr (a blockchain-based supply chain tracker developed with De Beers) and OpenSC (a supply chain tracker developed with the World Wide Fund for Nature) are projects backed by BCGDV.

Controversy

Angola 
An article published by The New York Times on January 19, 2020, identified the Boston Consulting Group as having worked with Isabel dos Santos, who exploited Angola's natural resources while the country suffers from poverty, illiteracy, and infant mortality. According to the article, BCG was contracted by the Angolan state-owned petroleum company Sonangol, as well as the jewelry company De Grisogono, owned by her husband through shell companies in Luxembourg, Malta and the Netherlands; the firm was reportedly paid through offshore companies in tax havens such as Malta.

Saudi Arabia 
The New York Times also reported that Boston Consulting Group is one of the consulting firms, along with McKinsey and Booz Allen, helping Crown Prince Mohammed bin Salman consolidate power in Saudi Arabia. While a BCG spokesperson said the firm turns down projects involving military and intelligence strategy, BCG is involved in designing the economic blueprint for the country, a plan called Vision 2030.

In June 2021, BCG was hired to examine the feasibility for the country to host the 2030 FIFA World Cup. The bid was assessed to be a great deal, as FIFA’s policy of continental rotation blocked all the Asian Football Confederation (AFC) nations from hosting the World Cup until 2034, after Qatar was set to become the first Middle Eastern nation to host the tournament in 2022.

Sweden 
Boston Consulting Group has received criticism for its involvement in the construction of the New Karolinska Solna University Hospital after an investigation by Dagens Nyheter. Specifically, the potential conflict of interest where a former BCG employee and then hospital executive approved numerous expenses without proper receipts and the high cost paid for external consultants including BCG. In the investigative journalism book Konsulterna - Kampen om Karolinska (roughly The Consultants - The Struggle for the Karolinska University Hospital), the authors and Dagens Nyheter journalists Anna Gustavsson and Lisa Röstlund argue that the value-based health care model as recommended by BCG had not been properly investigated and have resulted in an exponential growth in administration and lack of responsibility for patients.

Notable current and former employees

See also
 DICE framework

References

 
Consulting firms established in 1963
1963 establishments in Massachusetts
International management consulting firms
Privately held companies based in Massachusetts
Macroeconomics consulting firms
Management consulting firms of the United States
Companies based in Boston
History of Boston
Information technology consulting firms of the United States